Predestination, in theology, is the doctrine that all events have been willed by God, usually with reference to the eventual fate of the individual soul. Explanations of predestination often seek to address the paradox of free will, whereby God's omniscience seems incompatible with human free will. In this usage, predestination can be regarded as a form of religious determinism; and usually predeterminism, also known as theological determinism.

History

Pre-Christian period 
Some have argued that the Book of Enoch contains a deterministic worldview that is combined with dualism. The book of Jubilees seems to harmonize or mix together a doctrine of free will and determinism.

Ben Sira affirms free will, where God allows a choice of bad or good before the human and thus they can choose which one to follow.

New Testament period 
There is some disagreement among scholars regarding the views on predestination of first-century AD Judaism, out of which Christianity came. Josephus wrote during the first century that the three main Jewish sects differed on this question. He argued that the Essenes and Pharisees argued that God's providence orders all human events, but the Pharisees still maintained that people are able to choose between right and wrong. He wrote that the Sadducees did not have a doctrine of providence.

Biblical scholar N. T. Wright argues that Josephus's portrayal of these groups is incorrect, and that the Jewish debates referenced by Josephus should be seen as having to do with God's work to liberate Israel rather than philosophical questions about predestination. Wright asserts that Essenes were content to wait for God to liberate Israel while Pharisees believed Jews needed to act in cooperation with God. John Barclay responded that Josephus's description was an over-simplification and there were likely to be complex differences between these groups which may have been similar to those described by Josephus. Francis Watson has also argued on the basis of 4 Ezra, a document dated to the first century AD, that Jewish beliefs in predestination are primarily concerned with God's choice to save some individual Jews.

However some in the Qumran community possibly believed in predestination, for example 1QS states that "God has caused (his chosen ones) to inherit the lot of the Holy Ones".

In the New Testament, Romans 8–11 presents a statement on predestination. In Romans 8:28–30, Paul writes,
Biblical scholars have interpreted this passage in several ways. Many say this only has to do with service, and is not about salvation. The Catholic biblical commentator Brendan Byrne wrote that the predestination mentioned in this passage should be interpreted as applied to the Christian community corporately rather than individuals. Another Catholic commentator, Joseph Fitzmyer, wrote that this passage teaches that God has predestined the salvation of all humans. Douglas Moo, a Protestant biblical interpreter, reads the passage as teaching that God has predestined a certain set of people to salvation, and predestined the remainder of humanity to reprobation (damnation). Similarly, Wright's interpretation is that in this passage Paul teaches that God will save those whom he has chosen, but Wright also emphasizes that Paul does not intend to suggest that God has eliminated human free will or responsibility. Instead, Wright asserts, Paul is saying that God's will works through that of humans to accomplish salvation.

Patristic period

Ante-Nicene period 
Origen, writing in the third century, taught that God's providence extends to every individual. He believed God's predestination was based on God's foreknowledge of every individual's merits, whether in their current life or a previous life.

Gill and Gregg Alisson argued that Clement of Rome held to a predestinarian view of salvation.

Some verses in the Odes of Solomon, which was made by an Essene convert into Christianity, might possibly suggest a predestinarian worldview, where God chooses who are saved and go into heaven, although there is controversy about what it teaches. The Odes of Solomon talks about God "imprinting a seal on the face of the elect before they existed". The Thomasines saw themselves as children of the light, but the ones who were not part of the elect community were sons of darkness. The Thomasines thus had a belief in a type of election or predestination, they saw themselves as elect because they were born from the light.

Valentinus believed in a form of predestination, in his view humans are born into one of three natures, depending on which elements prevail in the person. In the views of Valentinus, a person born with a bad nature can never be saved because they are too inclined into evil, some people have a nature which is a mixture of good and evil, thus they can choose salvation, and others have a good nature, who will be saved, because they will be inclined into good.

Irenaeus also attacked the doctrine of predestination set out by Valentinus, arguing that it is unfair. For Irenaeus, humans were free to choose salvation or not.

Justin Martyr attacked predestinarian views held by some Greek philosophers.

Post-Nicene period 
Later in the fourth and fifth centuries, Augustine of Hippo (354–430) also taught that God orders all things while preserving human freedom. Prior to 396, Augustine believed that predestination was based on God's foreknowledge of whether individuals would believe, that God's grace was "a reward for human assent". Later, in response to Pelagius, Augustine said that the sin of pride consists in assuming that "we are the ones who choose God or that God chooses us (in his foreknowledge) because of something worthy in us", and argued that it is God's grace that causes the individual act of faith. Scholars are divided over whether Augustine's teaching implies double predestination, or the belief that God chooses some people for damnation as well as some for salvation. Catholic scholars tend to deny that he held such a view while some Protestants and secular scholars affirm that Augustine did believe in double predestination.

Augustine's position raised objections. Julian of Eclanum expressed the view that Augustine was bringing Manichean thoughts into the church. For Vincent of Lérins, this was a disturbing innovation. This new tension eventually became obvious with the confrontation between Augustine and Pelagius culminating in condemnation of Pelagianism (as interpreted by Augustine) at the Council of Ephesus in 431. Pelagius denied Augustine's view of predestination in order to affirm that salvation is achieved by an act of free will.

The Council of Arles in the late fifth century condemned the position "that some have been condemned to death, others have been predestined to life", though this may seem to follow from Augustine's teaching. The Second Council of Orange in 529 also condemned the position that "some have been truly predestined to evil by divine power".

In the eighth century, John of Damascus emphasized the freedom of the human will in his doctrine of predestination, and argued that acts arising from peoples' wills are not part of God's providence at all. Damascene teaches that people's good actions are done in cooperation with God, but are not caused by him.

Prosper of Aquitaine (390 – c. 455 AD) defended Augustine's view of predestination against semi-Pelagians. Marius Mercator, who was a pupil of Augustine wrote five books against Pelagianism and one book about predestination. Fulgentius of Ruspe and Caesarius of Arles rejected the view that God gives free choice to believe and instead believed in predestination.

Cassian believed that despite predestination being a work that God does, God only decides to predestinate based on how human beings will respond.

Augustine himself stated thus:And thus Christ’s Church has never failed to hold the faith of this predestination, which is now being defended with new solicitude against these modern heretics – Augustine.

Middle Ages 
Gottschalk of Orbais, a ninth-century Saxon monk, argued that God predestines some people to hell as well as predestining some to heaven, a view known as double predestination. He was condemned by several synods, but his views remained popular. Irish theologian John Scotus Eriugena wrote a refutation of Gottschalk. Eriugena abandoned Augustine's teaching on predestination. He wrote that God's predestination should be equated with his foreknowledge of people's choices.

In the twelfth century, Thomas Aquinas taught that God predestines certain people to the beatific vision based solely on his own goodness rather than that of creatures. Aquinas also believed that people are free in their choices, fully cause their own sin, and are solely responsible for it. According to Aquinas, there are several ways in which God wills actions. He directly wills the good, indirectly wills evil consequences of good things, and only permits evil. Aquinas held that in permitting evil, God does not will it to be done or not to be done.

In the thirteenth century, William of Ockham taught that God does not cause human choices and equated predestination with divine foreknowledge. Though Ockham taught that God predestines based on people's foreseen works, he maintained that God's will was not constrained to do this. Medieval theologians who believed in predestination include: John Wycliffe (1320s –1384),Gregory of Rimini (1300–1358), Johann Ruchrat von Wesel (died 1481), Johannes von Staupitz (1460–1524), Ratramnus (died 868), Thomas Bradwardine (1300–1349) and Girolamo Savonarola (1452–1498).

The medieval Cathars denied the free will of humans.

Reformation 
John Calvin rejected the idea that God permits rather than actively decrees the damnation of sinners, as well as other evil. Calvin did not believe God to be guilty of sin, but rather he considered God inflicting sin upon his creations to be an unfathomable mystery. Though he maintained God's predestination applies to damnation as well as salvation, he taught that the damnation of the damned is caused by their sin, but that the salvation of the saved is solely caused by God. Other Protestant Reformers, including Huldrych Zwingli, also held double predestinarian views.

Views of Christian branches

Eastern Orthodoxy 
The Eastern Orthodox view was summarized by Bishop Theophan the Recluse in response to the question, "What is the relationship between the Divine provision and our free will?"

Roman Catholicism 

Roman Catholicism teaches the doctrine of predestination. The Catechism of the Catholic Church says, "To God, all moments of time are present in their immediacy. When therefore he establishes his eternal plan of "predestination", he includes in it each person's free response to his grace." Therefore, in the Roman Catholic conception of predestination, free will is not denied.  However, Roman Catholic theology has discouraged beliefs that it is possible for anyone to know or predict anything about the operation and outcomes of predestination, and therefore it normally plays a very small role in Roman Catholic thinking.

The heretical seventeenth and eighteenth centuries sect within Roman Catholicism known as Jansenism preached the doctrine of double predestination, although Jansenism claimed that even members of the saved elect could lose their salvation by doing sinful, un-repented deeds, as implied in Ezekiel 18:21–28 in the Old Testament of the Bible. According to the Roman Catholic Church, God does not will anyone to mortally sin and so to deserve punishment in hell.

Pope John Paul II wrote:

Augustine of Hippo laid the foundation for much of the later Roman Catholic teaching on predestination. His teachings on grace and free will were largely adopted by the Second Council of Orange (529), whose decrees were directed against the Semipelagians. Augustine wrote,

Augustine also teaches that people have free will. For example, in "On Grace and Free Will", (see especially chapters II–IV) Augustine states that "He [God] has revealed to us, through His Holy Scriptures, that there is in man a free choice of will," and that "God's precepts themselves would be of no use to a man unless he had free choice of will, so that by performing them he might obtain the promised rewards." (chap. II)

Thomas Aquinas' views concerning predestination are largely in agreement with Augustine and can be summarized by many of his writings in his Summa Theologiæ:

Protestantism

Comparison 
This table summarizes the classical views of three different Protestant beliefs.

Lutheranism 
Lutherans historically hold to unconditional election to salvation. However, some do not believe that there are certain people that are predestined to salvation, but salvation is predestined for those who seek God. Lutherans believe Christians should be assured that they are among the predestined. However, they disagree with those who make predestination the source of salvation rather than Christ's suffering, death, and resurrection. Unlike some Calvinists, Lutherans do not believe in a predestination to damnation. Instead, Lutherans teach eternal damnation is a result of the unbeliever's rejection of the forgiveness of sins and unbelief.

Martin Luther's attitude towards predestination is set out in his On the Bondage of the Will, published in 1525. This publication by Luther was in response to the published treatise by Desiderius Erasmus in 1524 known as On Free Will.

Calvinism 

The Belgic Confession of 1561 affirmed that God "delivers and preserves" from perdition "all whom he, in his eternal and unchangeable council, of mere goodness hath elected in Christ Jesus our Lord, without respect to their works" (Article XVI).
Calvinists believe that God picked those whom he will save and bring with him to Heaven before the world was created. They also believe that those people God does not save will go to Hell. John Calvin thought people who were saved could never lose their salvation and the "elect" (those God saved) would know they were saved because of their actions.

In this common, loose sense of the term, to affirm or to deny predestination has particular reference to the Calvinist doctrine of unconditional election. In the Calvinist interpretation of the Bible, this doctrine normally has only pastoral value related to the assurance of salvation and the absolution of salvation by grace alone. However, the philosophical implications of the doctrine of election and predestination are sometimes discussed beyond these systematic bounds. Under the topic of the doctrine of God (theology proper), the predestinating decision of God cannot be contingent upon anything outside of himself, because all other things are dependent upon him for existence and meaning. Under the topic of the doctrines of salvation (soteriology), the predestinating decision of God is made from God's knowledge of his own will (Romans 9:15), and is therefore not contingent upon human decisions (rather, free human decisions are outworkings of the decision of God, which sets the total reality within which those decisions are made in exhaustive detail: that is, nothing left to chance). Calvinists do not pretend to understand how this works; but they are insistent that the Scriptures teach both the sovereign control of God and the responsibility and freedom of human decisions.

Calvinist groups use the term Hyper-Calvinism to describe Calvinistic systems that assert without qualification that God's intention to destroy some is equal to his intention to save others. Some forms of Hyper-Calvinism have racial implications, as when Dutch Calvinist theologian Franciscus Gomarus however argued that Jews, because of their refusal to worship Jesus Christ, were members of the non-elect, as also argued by John Calvin himself, based on I John 2:22–23 in The New Testament of the Bible. Some Dutch settlers in South Africa argued that black people were sons of Ham, whom Noah had cursed to be slaves, according to Genesis 9:18–19, or drew analogies between them and the Canaanites, suggesting a "chosen people" ideology similar to that espoused by proponents of the Jewish nation. This justified racial hierarchy on earth, as well as racial segregation of congregations, but did not exclude blacks from being part of the elect. Other Calvinists vigorously objected to these arguments (see Afrikaner Calvinism).

Expressed sympathetically, the Calvinist doctrine is that God has mercy or withholds it, with particular consciousness of who are to be the recipients of mercy in Christ. Therefore, the particular persons are chosen, out of the total number of human beings, who will be rescued from enslavement to sin and the fear of death, and from punishment due to sin, to dwell forever in his presence. Those who are being saved are assured through the gifts of faith, the sacraments, and communion with God through prayer and increase of good works, that their reconciliation with him through Christ is settled by the sovereign determination of God's will. God also has particular consciousness of those who are passed over by his selection, who are without excuse for their rebellion against him, and will be judged for their sins.

Calvinists typically divide on the issue of predestination into infralapsarians (sometimes called 'sublapsarians') and supralapsarians. Infralapsarians interpret the biblical election of God to highlight his love (1 John 4:8; Ephesians 1:4b–5a) and chose his elect considering the situation after the Fall, while supralapsarians interpret biblical election to highlight God's sovereignty (Romans 9:16) and that the Fall was ordained by God's decree of election. In infralapsarianism, election is God's response to the Fall, while in supralapsarianism the Fall is part of God's plan for election. In spite of the division, many Calvinist theologians would consider the debate surrounding the infra- and supralapsarian positions one in which scant Scriptural evidence can be mustered in either direction, and that, at any rate, has little effect on the overall doctrine.

Some Calvinists decline to describe the eternal decree of God in terms of a sequence of events or thoughts, and many caution against the simplifications involved in describing any action of God in speculative terms. Most make distinctions between the positive manner in which God chooses some to be recipients of grace, and the manner in which grace is consciously withheld so that some are destined for everlasting punishments.

Debate concerning predestination according to the common usage concerns the destiny of the damned: whether God is just if that destiny is settled prior to the existence of any actual volition of the individual, and whether the individual is in any meaningful sense responsible for his destiny if it is settled by the eternal action of God.

Arminianism 
At the beginning of the 17th century, the Dutch theologian Jacobus Arminius formulated Arminianism and disagreed with Calvin in particular on election and predestination.
Arminianism is defined by God's limited mode of providence. This mode of providence affirms the compatibility between human free will and divine foreknowledge, but its incompatibility with theological determinism. Thus predestination in Arminianism is based on divine foreknowledge, unlike in Calvinism. It is therefore a predestination by foreknowledge.

From this perspective, comes the notion of a conditional election on the one who wills to have faith in God for salvation. This means that God does not predetermine, but instead infallibly knows who will believe and perseveringly be saved. Although God knows from the beginning of the world who will go where, the choice is still with the individual.

The Church of Jesus Christ of Latter-day Saints 
The Church of Jesus Christ of Latter-day Saints (LDS Church) rejects the doctrine of predestination, but does believe in foreordination. Foreordination, an important doctrine of the LDS Church, teaches that during the pre-mortal existence, God selected ("foreordained") particular people to fulfill certain missions ("callings") during their mortal lives. For example, prophets were foreordained to be the Lord's servants (see Jeremiah 1:5), all who receive the priesthood were foreordained to that calling, and Jesus was foreordained to enact the atonement.

The LDS Church teaches the doctrine of moral agency, the ability to choose and act for oneself, and decide whether to accept Christ's atonement.

Types of predestination

Conditional election
Conditional election is the belief that God chooses for eternal salvation those whom he foresees will have faith in Christ. This belief emphasizes the importance of a person's free will. The counter-view is known as unconditional election, and is the belief that God chooses whomever he will, based solely on his purposes and apart from an individual's free will. It has long been an issue in Calvinist–Arminian debate. An alternative viewpoint is Corporate election, which distinguishes God's election and predestination for corporate entities such as the community "in Christ," and individuals who can benefit from that community's election and predestination so long as they continue belonging to that community.

Supralapsarianism and infralapsarianism
Infralapsarianism (also called sublapsarianism) holds that predestination logically coincides with the preordination of Man's fall into sin. That is, God predestined sinful men for salvation. Therefore, according to this view, God is the ultimate cause, but not the proximate source or "author" of sin. Infralapsarians often emphasize a difference between God's decree (which is inviolable and inscrutable), and his revealed will (against which man is disobedient). Proponents also typically emphasize the grace and mercy of God toward all men, although teaching also that only some are predestined for salvation.

In common English parlance, the doctrine of predestination often has particular reference to the doctrines of Calvinism. The version of predestination espoused by John Calvin, after whom Calvinism is named, is sometimes referred to as "double predestination" because in it God predestines some people for salvation (i.e. unconditional election) and some for condemnation (i.e. Reprobation) which results by allowing the individual's own sins to condemn them. Calvin himself defines predestination as "the eternal decree of God, by which he determined with himself whatever he wished to happen with regard to every man. Not all are created on equal terms, but some are preordained to eternal life, others to eternal damnation; and, accordingly, as each has been created for one or other of these ends, we say that he has been predestined to life or to death."

On the spectrum of beliefs concerning predestination, Calvinism is the strongest form among Christians. It teaches that God's predestining decision is based on the knowledge of his own will rather than foreknowledge, concerning every particular person and event; and, God continually acts with entire freedom, in order to bring about his will in completeness, but in such a way that the freedom of the creature is not violated, "but rather, established".

Calvinists who hold the infralapsarian view of predestination usually prefer that term to "sublapsarianism," perhaps with the intent of blocking the inference that they believe predestination is on the basis of foreknowledge (sublapsarian meaning, assuming the fall into sin). The different terminology has the benefit of distinguishing the Calvinist double predestination version of infralapsarianism from Lutheranism's view that predestination is a mystery, which forbids the unprofitable intrusion of prying minds since God only reveals partial knowledge to the human race.

Supralapsarianism is the doctrine that God's decree of predestination for salvation and reprobation logically precedes his preordination of the human race's fall into sin. That is, God decided to save, and to damn; he then determined the means by which that would be made possible. It is a matter of controversy whether or not Calvin himself held this view, but most scholars link him with the infralapsarian position. It is known, however, that Calvin's successor in Geneva, Theodore Beza, held to the supralapsarian view.

Double predestination

Double predestination, or the double decree, is the doctrine that God actively reprobates, or decrees damnation of some, as well as salvation for those whom he has elected. During the Protestant Reformation John Calvin held this double predestinarian view: "By predestination we mean the eternal decree of God, by which he determined with himself whatever he wished to happen with regard to every man. All are not created on equal terms, but some are preordained to eternal life, others to eternal damnation; and, accordingly, as each has been created for one or other of these ends, we say that he has been predestinated to life or to death." Gottschalk of Orbais taught double predestination explicitly in the ninth century, and Gregory of Rimini in the fourteenth. Some trace this doctrine to statements made by Augustine in the early fifth century that on their own also seem to teach double predestination, but in the context of his other writings it is not clear whether he held this view. In "The City of God," Augustine describes all of humanity as being predestinated for salvation (i.e., the city of God) or damnation (i.e., the earthly city of man); but Augustine also held that all human beings were born "reprobate" but "need not necessarily remain" in that state of reprobation.

Corporate election 

Corporate election is a non-traditional Arminian view of election. In corporate election, God does not choose which individuals he will save prior to creation, but rather God chooses the church as a whole. Or put differently, God chooses what type of individuals he will save. Another way the New Testament puts this is to say that God chose the church in Christ (Eph. 1:4). In other words, God chose from all eternity to save all those who would be found in Christ, by faith in God. This choosing is not primarily about salvation from eternal destruction either but is about God's chosen agency in the world. Thus individuals have full freedom in terms of whether they become members of the church or not. Corporate election is thus consistent with the open view's position on God's omniscience, which states that God's foreknowledge does not determine the outcomes of individual free will.

Middle Knowledge 
Middle Knowledge is a concept that was developed by Jesuit theologian Luis de Molina, and exists under a doctrine called Molinism. It attempts to deal with the topic of predestination by reconciling God's sovereign providence with the notion of libertarian free will. The concept of Middle Knowledge holds that God has a knowledge of true pre-volitional counterfactuals for all free creatures. That is, what any individual creature with a free will (e.g. a human) would do under any given circumstance. God's knowledge of counterfactuals is reasoned to occur logically prior to his divine creative decree (that is, prior to creation), and after his knowledge of necessary truths. Thus, Middle Knowledge holds that before the world was created, God knew what every existing creature capable of libertarian freedom (e.g. every individual human) would freely choose to do in all possible circumstances. It then holds that based on this information, God elected from a number of these possible worlds, the world most consistent with his ultimate will, which is the actual world that we live in.

For example:
 if Free Creature A was to be placed in Circumstance B, God via his Middle Knowledge would know that Free Creature A will freely choose option Y over option Z.
 if Free Creature A was to be placed in Circumstance C, God via his Middle Knowledge would know that Free Creature A will freely choose option Z over option Y.

Based on this Middle Knowledge, God has the ability to actualise the world in which A is placed in a circumstance that he freely chooses to do what is consistent with Gods ultimate will. If God determined that the world most suited to his purposes is a world in which A would freely choose Y instead of Z, God can actualise a world in which Free Creature A finds himself in Circumstance B.

In this way, Middle Knowledge is thought of by its proponents to be consistent with any theological doctrines that assert God as having divine providence and man having a libertarian freedom (e.g. Calvinism, Catholicism, Lutheranism), and to offer a potential solution to the concerns that God's providence somehow nullifies man from having true liberty in his choices.

See also

 Biochemical Predestination
 Clockwork universe
 Fatalism
 Jansenism
 Oedipus Tyrannus and Greek tragedy
 Predestination in Islam
 Providentialism
 Theological determinism
 The Protestant Ethic and the Spirit of Capitalism
 Vocation
 Eternal security

References

Citations

Sources
 Calvin, John. Institutes of the Christian Religion, (Henry Beveridge, trans.)

Further reading
 Leif Dixon, Practical Predestinarians in England, c. 1590–1640; Farnham, Ashgate, 2013, . Book review at Practical Predestinarians in England, c. 1590–1640 | Reviews in History
 Akin, James. The Salvation Controversy. San Diego, Calif.: Catholic Answers, 2001. Vid. pp. 77, 83–87, explaining the resemblances of this Catholic dogma with, and the divergences from, the teaching of Calvin and Luther on this matter. 
 Garrigou-Lagrange, Réginald. Predestination. Rockford, Ill.: TAN Books, 1998, cop. 1939. N.B.: Trans. of the author's La Prédestination des saints et la grâce; reprint of the 1939 ed. of the trans. published by G. Herder Book Co., Saint Louis, Mo. 
 
 ___. "John Plaifere (d.1632) on Conditional Predestination: A Well-mixed Version of scientia media and Resistible Grace." Reformation & Renaissance Review, 18.2 (2016): 155–73.

External links
 "Determinism in Theology: Predestination" by Robert M. Kindon in The Dictionary of the History of Ideas (1973–74)
 "The question asked was does God know the future and how we will turn out."
 Predestination
 Understanding Predestination in Islam
 Detailed Lecture on Islamic Perspective on Fate
 Occurrences of "predestination" in the Bible text (ESV)
 The Reformed Doctrine of Predestination (1932) by Loraine Boettner (conservative Calvinist perspective)
 The Biblical Doctrine Of Predestination, Foreordination, and Election  by F. Furman Kearley (Arminian perspective)
 "Predestination" from The Catholic Encyclopedia (1913)
 Academic articles on predestination and election (Lutheran perspective)
 Predestination and Free Will Overview of the concept of predestination from the Protestant and Catholic perspectives
 On the Presuppositions of our Personal Salvation Grace and predestination from the Orthodox perspective

Calvinist theology
Catholic theology and doctrine
Christian philosophy
Christian soteriology
Christian terminology
Destiny
Religious philosophical concepts